Countess Eleonóra Zichy de Zich et Vásonkeő (28 March 1867 – 31 October 1945) was a Hungarian noblewoman, granddaughter of Count Manó Péchy. Her parents were Count Rezső Zichy and Countess Jacqueline Péchy.

She married Tivadar Andrássy, son of Gyula Andrássy on 24 June 1885; they had four children:

 Ilona (1886–1967); wife of József Cziráky; emigrated to Canada in 1961
 Borbála (1890–1968), wife of Marquis György Pallavicini
 Katinka (1892–1985), Red Countess, wife of Count Mihály Károlyi
 Klára (1898–1941), Communist partisan
In 1909, four years after her husband's death, Eleonóra Zichy married to her former brother in law, Gyula Andrássy the Younger, brother of Tivadar.

References

External links
 Iván Nagy: Magyarország családai czimerekkel és nemzedékrendi táblákkal. I-XIII. Bp., 1857–1868
 

1867 births
1945 deaths
Place of birth missing
Hungarian nobility
Eleonora